Mario Fehr (born 13 September 1958) is a Swiss politician. As member of the Social Democratic Party of Switzerland (SP), he served in the Cantonal Council of Zürich from 1991 to 2000 and the Swiss National Council from 1999 to 2011. In 2011 he was first elected to the seven-member Executive Council of Zürich, where he led the ministry of security. He was re-elected in 2015 (second highest share of votes) and 2019 (highest share of votes). He left the Social Democratic Party in 2021 over disputes with the cantonal SP leadership and has since continued to serve as an independent.

He is a lawyer by profession.

External links

1958 births
Living people
Members of the National Council (Switzerland)
Social Democratic Party of Switzerland politicians